The 1991–92 FIS Ski Jumping World Cup was the 13th World Cup season in ski jumping and the 2nd official World Cup season in ski flying. It began in Thunder Bay, Canada on 1 December 1991 and finished in Planica, Slovenia on 29 March 1992. The individual World Cup was won by Toni Nieminen and Nations Cup by Austria.

Lower competitive circuit this season included the Europa/Continental Cup.

Map of world cup hosts 
All 16 locations which have been hosting world cup events for men this season. Event in Falun canceled. Oberstdorf hosted ski flying event and four hills tournament.

 Four Hills Tournament
 Swiss Tournament
 World Cup & Ski Flying World Championships

Calendar

Men

Men's team

Standings

Overall

Ski Flying

Nations Cup

Four Hills Tournament

References 

World cup
World cup
FIS Ski Jumping World Cup